Achille Solari (Naples, October 9, 1835 - 1884) was an Italian painter, mainly of landscapes of the region around Naples.

He obtained a stipend from the province of Terra di Lavoro to study at the Institute of Fine Arts of Naples, and earned prizes and a stipend in Naples from his province. Paints in oil and watercolor. He exhibited in 1884 in Turin, and in London he exhibited a landscape. He has exhibited repeatedly at the Promotrice of Naples and others, watercolors and oils, of land and seascapes, including a Veduta di Santa Lucia in Naples. He painted in a style reminiscent of his rough contemporaries Giacinto Gigante and Gabriele Smargiassi.

References

1835 births
1884 deaths
19th-century Italian painters
Italian male painters
Painters from Naples
19th-century Italian male artists